Tuen Mun Sports Association (also known as Tuen Mun) is a Hong Kong football club which currently competes in the Hong Kong Second Division. It is run by the Tuen Mun District Council.

The club plays its home matches at Siu Lun Sports Ground.

History
Tuen Mun won the runners-up of the Hong Kong Second Division in the season 2009–10 and qualified for promotion to the Hong Kong First Division for the first time in the 2010–11 season. The club spent a couple of years at the top flight before spending a year on hiatus in 2013–14. They later rejoined the second tier of the Hong Kong football pyramid in 2014–15.

2012–13 season
After gaining two season's experiences in the First Division, Tuen Mun played with an impressive start in the season 2012–13. After the sixth round, they climbed to third in the league table. On 30 October 2012, Tuen Mun spokesperson told to media that the club was facing financial problems because of the divestment of president Chan Keung. Various key players including Li Haiqiang, Yip Tsz Chun, Ling Cong and all 4 foreign players, as well as the whole coaching team, were proposed to be released by the club. Two weeks later, the board of Tuen Mun announced that the financial problem of the club had been solved. As a result, all players and coaches remained with the club. Tuen Mun finished third in the 2012–13 season.

Ground
The club plays most of its home matches at Wu Shan Recreation Playground and Siu Lun Sports Ground.

Honours

League
 Hong Kong Second Division
Runners-up (1): 2009–10
 Hong Kong Third Division
Champions (1): 2008–09
 Hong Kong Third District Division
Champions (1): 2004–05

External links
 Tuen Mun Sports Association official website 
 Tuen Mun at HKFA

References

 
Football clubs in Hong Kong
Tuen Mun
1963 establishments in Hong Kong
Hong Kong Second Division League
Association football clubs established in 1963